Villaverde de Arcayos is a locality located in the municipality of Almanza, in León province, Castile and León, Spain. As of 2020, it has a population of 124.

Geography 
Villaverde de Arcayos is located 63km east of León, Spain.

References

Populated places in the Province of León